NNSA may refer to
 National Nuclear Safety Administration, People's Republic of China
 National Nuclear Security Administration, United States of America